Tus, also known as terminus utilization substance, is a protein that binds to terminator sequences and acts as a counter-helicase when it comes in contact with an advancing helicase. The bound Tus protein effectively halts DNA polymerase movement. Tus helps end DNA replication in prokaryotes.

In E. coli, Tus binds to 10 closely related sites encoded in the chromosome. Each site is 23 base pairs. The 10 sites are called Ter sites, and are designated TerA, TerB, ..., TerJ.  These binding sites are asymmetric, such that when a Tus-Ter complex (Tus protein bound to a Ter site) is encountered by a replication fork from one direction, the complex is dissociated and replication continues (permissive). But when encountered from the other direction, the Tus-Ter complex provides a much larger kinetic barrier and halts replication (non-permissive). The multiple Ter sites in the chromosome are oriented such that the two oppositely moving replication forks are both stalled in the desired termination region.

Bacillus subtilis utilize replication terminator protein (RTP) instead of Tus.

Protein domains 
The Ter protein contains two domains. The N-terminal domain is composed of an alpha helices, beta sheet, and three loops. The C-terminal domain is made of two alpha helices and one beta sheet.

Further reading
 "Interaction of the Escherichia coli replication terminator protein (Tus) with DNA: a model derived from DNA-binding studies of mutant proteins by surface plasmon resonance."
 "Replication termination in Escherichia coli: structure and antihelicase activity of the Tus-Ter complex."
 "A molecular mousetrap determines polarity of termination of DNA replication in E. coli."
 "Isolation and characterization of mutants of Tus, the replication arrest protein of Escherichia coli."
 "Biophysical characteristics of Tus, the replication arrest protein of Escherichia coli."
 "Structure of a replication-terminator protein complexed with DNA."
 Structure at protein data bank

References 

DNA replication